Crossmark, Inc., stylized as CROSSMARK, is a sales and marketing services company that operates within the consumer goods industry. The company was established in 1905 by Willis Johnson and E. Leslie Hunt in Fort Smith, Arkansas as a provision supply point for groups traveling to the Oklahoma Territory. Crossmark contributes research and data to the Food Marketing Institute. The company serves grocery, mass, club, drug, convenience store, and home improvement channels.

History
1906 - Company founded as Johnson and Hunt Merchandise Brokers in Fort Smith, Arkansas 
1914 - Company renamed Willis Johnson & Company, operations moved to Little Rock, Arkansas
1943 - President Roosevelt names Willis Johnson Sr. to the national office of price and administration (two-year assignment)
1944 - W.L. Gordon Company formed in Dallas, Texas
1953 - Phillips Brokerage Company created in Birmingham, Alabama 
1960s and 70s - These three companies grew and prospered
1977 - Willis Johnson Company calls on Sam Walton in 1977
1981 - Willis Johnson Company changes its name to SalesMark
1995 - Three companies and alpha one merges
In 1997, Crossmark was one of three companies that collectively controlled 75 percent of the sales and marketing services industry. In 2012, The Dallas Morning News reported that the Plano, Texas-based Crossmark had 34,000 employees and has an estimated annual revenue of $1 billion. In December 2012, a majority of the company was sold to the private equity firm Warburg Pincus. In November 2013, Crossmark acquired the assets of PromoWorks.

Products and services
Crossmark's services include headquarter sales, retail merchandising, in-store data collection, event marketing, retail technology, and retail analytics.

On August 6, 2013, Crossmark agreed to buy Marketing Werks in Chicago. The Marketing Werks deal will contribute to its total annual revenue of nearly $1 billion. Marketing Werks, based in Chicago, provides experiential marketing campaigns for companies in several consumer industries. It will become part of Crossmark Marketing Services, which offers in-store events, experiential marketing, shopper marketing, consumer engagement and field intelligence. Mike Graen has joined CROSSMARK as Vice President/Managing Director for CROSSMARK's Center for Collaboration in Bentonville, Arkansas, which opened in July 2014.

Recognition
In 2010 and 2011, InformationWeek ranked Crossmark on its list of most-innovative users of business technology.

References

Business services companies established in 1905
Marketing companies established in 1905
Marketing companies of the United States
Business services companies of the United States
Companies based in Plano, Texas
1905 establishments in Arkansas